Daba Gardens ("Daba Vari Thota") is a neighborhood in Visakhapatnam, Andhra Pradesh, India. It is hub for shopping malls, electronic shopping especially, shopping for cell phones, restaurants, educational institutes etc. LIC building is the main landmark in this area. BSNL office is also situated here.

Commerce
It is a major commercial area in Visakhapatnam. It is oldest suburb in the city. There is a lot of shopping malls like Pantaloons, MF Khan, Hirawats etc.

References

Neighbourhoods in Visakhapatnam